Thomas J. Wilson (born 1958) is chairman, chief executive officer, and president of The Allstate Corporation. Wilson is also a member of the corporation's board of directors.

Early life
Wilson was born in St. Clair Shores, Michigan. He graduated from Lake Shore High School in 1975. He subsequently earned a Bachelor of Science in Business Administration from the University of Michigan and later earned an MBA from Northwestern University's Kellogg School of Management in 1980.

Career
Wilson held various financial positions at Amoco Corporation, where he worked from 1980 to 1986. He was managing director of mergers and acquisitions at Dean Witter Reynolds from 1986 to 1993.

Wilson was formerly chairman and president of Allstate Financial, where he led expansion of financial retirement services. Prior to this role Wilson served as Allstate’s chief financial officer. Before joining Allstate in 1995 he worked for Sears, Roebuck and Company, where he was vice president of strategy and analysis. He was responsible for strategic planning, financial planning and analysis, and special projects for the corporation. From 2005 to 2006, Wilson was president and chief operating officer of The Allstate Corporation, and from 2002 to 2006 he was also president of Allstate Protection.  According to salary.com, Wilson received $17.1 million in fiscal year 2017.

Wilson serves on the boards of the Property Casualty Insurers Association of America and the US Chamber of Commerce. He is a former board member of World Business Chicago.

Philanthropy
Wilson is a member of the board of trustees of Rush University Medical Center as well as a former board member of Francis W. Parker School. He is also a member of the Young Presidents' Organization and co-founder of the Get IN Chicago Foundation.  Wilson is a Civic Committee member of the Commercial Club of Chicago.

Personal life
Wilson currently lives in Chicago. In 2017, Wilson and his wife sold their Lincoln Park home of more than two decades for $2.5 million.

References

External links
 Thomas J Wilson Allstate Corporation Bio

American chief executives of financial services companies
Corporate executives
Kellogg School of Management alumni
Living people
1958 births
American corporate directors
Allstate
Ross School of Business alumni
American chief operating officers